Oliver Everett,  is a former British diplomat and academic, who served as Royal Librarian to the Sovereign of the United Kingdom.

This office, in the Royal Collection Department of the Royal Household of the Sovereign of the United Kingdom, is responsible for the care and maintenance of the royal collection of books and manuscripts owned by the Sovereign in an official capacity – as distinct from those owned privately and displayed at Sandringham House and Balmoral Castle and elsewhere.

Everett was educated at St Aubyn's School in Woodford Green Essex having been Captain of the 1st XV Felsted, the Western Reserve Academy in Hudson, Ohio and at Christ's College, Cambridge, and he has a master's degree in international relations from The Fletcher School of Law and Diplomacy, and did post-graduate work in international relations at the London School of Economics.

He joined the Foreign and Commonwealth Office in 1967 and was 1st Secretary in New Delhi 1969 to 1973. Subsequent service in the Diplomatic Service included a posting as Head of Chancery in Madrid 1980 to 1981.

From 1978 to 1980 he was seconded as Assistant Private Secretary to the Prince of Wales. After leaving the Diplomatic Service in 1981 he served as Private Secretary to the Princess of Wales 1981 to 1983, and as Librarian, Royal Library, 1985–2002 (he was deputy librarian 1984–1985). He is now a NADFAS lecturer, and Librarian Emeritus, Windsor Castle. In 1999 He received the Queen Elizabeth II Version of the Royal Household Long and Faithful Service Medal for 20 years cumulative service to the British Royal Family.

References

British diplomats
English librarians
Commanders of the Royal Victorian Order
People educated at Felsted School
Alumni of the London School of Economics
Living people
Date of birth unknown
Royal Librarians
Members of the Household of the Prince of Wales
Western Reserve Academy alumni
Year of birth missing (living people)